This is a list of notable events relating to the environment in 2016. They relate to environmental law, conservation, environmentalism and environmental issues.

Events
Preparation for the 2016 Summer Olympics in Rio de Janeiro included the integration of environmental elements into "Green Games for a Blue Planet" vision and planted 2386 seedlings to offset 716 tons of carbon emitted over the two years of the campaign.

See also

Human impact on the environment
List of environmental issues

References